Bošnjane may refer to:

 Bošnjane (Paraćin), a village in Serbia
 Bošnjane (Rača), a village in Serbia
 Bošnjane (Varvarin), a village in Serbia